BABA B1A4 was the first domestic concert of South Korean boy band B1A4. It opened on December 8, 2012 at the SK Handball Olympic Gymnasium at the Olympic Park, Seoul and ended the next day with tickets sold on October 18. BABA B1A4 had approximately 11,000 attendees.

Background

The tour began at the SK Olympic Handball Gymnasium (a.k.a. Olympic Fencing Gymnasium) on December 8 and 9, 2012.  It was reported on October 19, 2012 that all 8,000 tickets available were already sold out with an initial number of 75,000 people trying to visit the ticketing sites to purchase a ticket. After the success of the concert in South Korea, B1A4 also went on to present BABA B1A4 in Japan, Indonesia, and Taiwan.

Set List

Dates

References

2012 concert tours
B1A4 concert tours